Anders "Antti" August Raita (15 November 1883 – 1 September 1968) was a Finnish road racing cyclist who competed in the 1912 Summer Olympics. He was born in Turku and died in St. Clair Shores, Michigan, United States.

In 1912 he was a member of the Finnish cycling team which finished fifth in the team time trial event. In the individual time trial competition he finished sixth. He won the Finnish national road race title in 1912 and 1913.

References

External links

1883 births
1968 deaths
Finnish male cyclists
Olympic cyclists of Finland
Cyclists at the 1912 Summer Olympics
Sportspeople from Turku